The 1965 Vanderbilt Commodores football team represented Vanderbilt University in the 1965 NCAA University Division football season. The Commodores were led by head coach John Green in his third season and finished the season with a record of two wins, seven losses and one tie (2–7–1 overall, 1–5 in the SEC).

Schedule

References

Vanderbilt
Vanderbilt Commodores football seasons
Vanderbilt Commodores football